Bernard Dell (born 1949) is an Australian botanist. He is a research director at Murdoch University developing strategic research partnerships with China and nearby countries. His research spans the disciplines of agriculture and forestry. He is the author of books and academic papers on these subjects and is the recipient of a Murdoch University Excellence in Research Award (2012), the China Friendship Award (2014) and the Chiang Mai University Award (2015).

References

1949 births
20th-century Australian botanists
Living people
Place of birth missing (living people)
21st-century Australian botanists